Elçin Sangu (born 13 August 1985) is a Turkish actress and model of Circassian descent. With her appearance on television ads and campaigns, she has become one of the highest paid celebrities in Turkey.

Sangu is best known for her leading role Defne in the Star TV romantic comedy series Kiralık Aşk (2015–2017). For this work, she has been nominated and has received multiple awards in Turkey, including three Golden Butterfly Awards. Sangu also appeared in the television series Öyle Bir Geçer Zaman ki (2011),  Aşk Kaç Beden Giyer (2012–2013), Bir Aşk Hikâyesi (2013–2014),  Kurt Seyit ve Şura (2014), and Sevdam Alabora (2015).

Life and career
Elçin Sangu was born on 13 August 1985, as the only child of an ethnic Circassian family from İzmir in Western coast of Turkey. She graduated from Opera Department at Mersin University and took acting lessons at the Sahne Tozu Theatre.

In 2011, she was cast as Jale in Kanal D drama series Öyle Bir Geçer Zaman ki, where she also sang and played piano. Between 2012–2013, she played the lead role of Nehir in Aşk Kaç Beden Giyer. From 2013 to 2014, she starred as Eda in Bir Aşk Hikâyesi, an adaptation of the South Korean television series I'm Sorry, I Love You. In 2014, she portrayed Güzide in historical drama series Kurt Seyit ve Şura filmed in Russia, Turkey, and Ukraine. Following another leading role in 2015 aTV series Sevdam Alabora, she started acting in Kiralık Aşk the same year. In 2016, she became the face of Sunsilk care products, and Boyner.

The popular romantic comedy series Kiralık Aşk aired on Star TV until its finale in January 2017. Her performance in the series received critical acclaim. In 2017, it was reported that Sangu would appear in a news series on Kanal D. In August of the same year, Sangu together Barış Arduç were cast in the movie Mutluluk Zamanı (previously titled Yanımda Kal and Gitme Sen!).

Personal life
Since 2011 Sangu is in a relationship with Yunus Özdiken, who holds a job at a private firm outside the world of arts and entertainment. 

Sangu was chosen as the second most popular actress in Turkey in 2016, based on a number of different surveys. As of September 2016, she is the tenth most followed Turkish celebrity on Instagram.

Filmography

Film

Television

Music videos

Theatre

References

External links

 

1986 births
Living people
21st-century Turkish actresses
Golden Butterfly Award winners
Actresses from İzmir
Turkish female models
21st-century Turkish women opera singers
Turkish people of Circassian descent
Turkish television actresses
Turkish film actresses
Mersin University alumni